Seminole Independent School District is a public school district based in Seminole, Texas (USA).

In 2009, the school district was rated "academically acceptable" by the Texas Education Agency.

Schools
Seminole High School (Grades 9-12)
Seminole Junior High School (Grades 6-8)
Seminole Elementary School (Grades 4-5)
Seminole Primary School (Grades 2-3)
F.J. Young Elementary School (Grades PK-1)

References

External links
Seminole ISD

School districts in Gaines County, Texas